Coahuilteco was one of the Pakawan languages that was spoken in southern Texas (United States) and northeastern Coahuila (Mexico). It is now extinct.

Classification
Coahuilteco was grouped in an eponymous Coahuiltecan family by John Wesley Powell in 1891, later expanded by additional proposed members by e.g. Edward Sapir. Ives Goddard later treated all these connections with suspicion, leaving Coahuilteco as a language isolate. Manaster Ramer (1996) argues Powell's original more narrow Coahuiltecan grouping is sound, renaming it Pakawan in distinction from the later more expanded proposal. This proposal has been challenged by Campbell, who considers its sound correspondences unsupported and considers that some of the observed similarities between words may be due to borrowing.

Sounds

Consonants

Vowels

Coahuilteco has both short and long vowels.

Syntax 
Based primarily on study of one 88-page document, Fray Bartolomé García's 1760 Manual para administrar los santos sacramentos de penitencia, eucharistia, extrema-uncion, y matrimonio: dar gracias despues de comulgar, y ayudar a bien morir, Troike describes two of Coahuilteco's less common syntactic traits: subject-object concord and center-embedding relative clauses.

Subject-Object Concord 
In each of these sentences, the object Dios 'God' is the same, but the subject is different, and as a result different suffixes (-n for first person, -m for second person, and -t for third person) must be present after the demonstrative tupo· (Troike 1981:663).

Center-embedding Relative Clauses 
Troike (2015:135) notes that relative clauses in Coahuilteco can appear between the noun and its demonstrative (NP --> N (Srel) Dem), leading to a center-embedding structure quite distinct from the right-branching or left-branching structures more commonly seen in the world's languages. 

One example of such a center-embedded relative clause is the following:

The Coahuilteco text studied by Troike also has examples of two levels of embedding of relative clauses, as in the following example (Troike 2015:138):

See also
Coahuiltecan languages
Coahuiltecan people

References

Bibliography

 Goddard, Ives (Ed.). (1996). Languages. Handbook of North American Indians (W. C. Sturtevant, General Ed.) (Vol. 17). Washington, D. C.: Smithsonian Institution. .
 Mithun, Marianne. (1999). The languages of Native North America. Cambridge: Cambridge University Press.  (hbk); .
 Sturtevant, William C. (Ed.). (1978–present). Handbook of North American Indians (Vol. 1-20). Washington, D. C.: Smithsonian Institution. (Vols. 1-3, 16, 18-20 not yet published).
 Troike, Rudolph. (1996). Coahuilteco (Pajalate). In I. Goddard (Ed.), Languages (pp. 644–665). Handbook of North American Indians. Washington, D. C.: Smithsonian Institution.

External links

 Coahuiltecan Indians
 Reassessing Cultural Extinction: Change and Survival at Mission San Juan Capistrano, Texas – Chapter 8: Linguistics

Pakawan languages
Extinct languages of North America
Indigenous languages of the Southwestern United States
Indigenous languages of the North American Southwest
Native American history of Texas
Hokan languages
Indigenous languages of Texas
Coahuiltecan languages
Language isolates of North America

hr:Coahuiltec Indijanci